Villa Soriano is a town in the Soriano Department of Uruguay.  Historically, it was also known as Santo Domingo de Soriano. It had acquired the status of "Villa" (town) before the Independence of Uruguay.

Geography
It is located on the northwest end of Route 96, on the south bank of the river Río Negro,  before it discharges into Río Uruguay.

History
In 1624, a Franciscan Mission established a village for the indigenous tribes of the area named Santo Domingo de Soriano. It constituted the first permanent European settlement on Uruguayan soil, predating the foundation of Colonia del Sacramento by more than fifty years. It was moved to its current location in 1708. The construction of its church began in 1751.

The town has strong associations with General José Gervasio Artigas, who is honoured by Uruguayans as the 19th century liberator of the country.

Population
In 2011, Villa Soriano had a population of 1,124.

Places of worship
 St. Dominic Soriano Chapel (Roman Catholic)

See also
 Soriano Department
 History of Uruguay

References

External links
https://www.villasoriano.com/ Page documenting the founding of Villa Santo Domingo Soriano, Uruguay, in 1624. Based on Wilde Marotta's book and Federico Marotta's research work.
 Official site of Villa Soriano 
  SorianoTotal.com 'Villa Soriano' 
 Villa Santo Domingo Soriano 
 Villa Soriano, Uruguay 
INE map of Villa Soriano and La Loma

Populated places in the Soriano Department
Populated places established in 1624